Adnan Iqbal Chaudhry (born 15 December 1971) is a Pakistani jurist who has been Justice of the Sindh High Court since 6 February 2018.

References

1971 births
Living people
Judges of the Sindh High Court
Pakistani judges